Stenidea bituberosa is a species of beetle in the family Cerambycidae. It was described by Stephan von Breuning in 1940. It is known from Ethiopia, Kenya, Tanzania and Uganda.

References

bituberosa
Beetles described in 1940